Cross & Passion College may refer to:
 Cross & Passion College (Ballycastle), Northern Ireland
Cross and Passion College (Kilcullen), County Kildare